Sporting Honour is a 1951 Soviet sports film directed by  Vladimir Petrov and starring  Aleksei Gribov, Grigori Sergeyev and Margarita Lifanova. It was awarded the Stalin Prize, although political objections had delayed its release.

Plot
Worker of the Ural plant Vetlugin becomes a member of the Moscow football team 'Turbina'. Known to the whole country captain and center striker Vitaly Grinko is jealous of the newcomer and tries to discredit the simple-minded football player. The whole team takes the newcomer's side, criticizes the behavior of the captain, and in the game with the foreign team wins.

Cast
 Aleksei Gribov as Pyotr Semyonovich Grinko 
 Grigori Sergeyev as Vitali Grinko  
 Margarita Lifanova as Tonya Grinko  
 Lev Frichinsky  as Vetlugin 
 Nikolay Kryuchkov  as Coach of 'Turbina' team  
 Vadim Sinyavsky  as Radio announcer  
 Boris Sitko  
 Anastasia Zuyeva as Ekaterina Nikolaevna Grinko
 Vladimir Vladislavskiy 
 Lev Fenin 
 Mikhail Semichastny 
 Mikhail Antonevich  
 Boris Kochetov  
 Aleksandr Malyavkin  
 Vsevolod Radikorskiy 
 Nina Grebeshkova  Tonya's friend
 Yevgeny Leonov as Waiter 
 Tatyana Konyukhova as Tonya's friend
 Valentina Telegina as Vetlugina

References

Bibliography 
 Freedman, John. Silence's roar: the life and drama of Nikolai Erdman. Mosaic Press, 1992.

External links 
 

1951 films
Soviet association football films
1950s sports films
1950s Russian-language films
Films directed by Vladimir Petrov
Russian association football films
Mosfilm films
Soviet black-and-white films